is a Japanese anime television series based on the novels Little House in the Big Woods and Little House on the Prairie by Laura Ingalls Wilder. Twenty-six half-hour episodes were released between 1975 and 1976.

Characters
 Laura Ingalls
 The protagonist of the series.  

 Charles Ingalls
 Laura's father. 

 Caroline Ingalls
 Laura's mother. 

 Mary Ingalls
 Laura's older sister. 

 Carrie Ingalls
 Laura's younger sister. 

 Mr. Edwards

Staff
 Directors: Seiji Endō and Mitsuo Ezaki
 Writer: Masao Maruyama
 Executive Producer: Kōichi Motohashi
 Music: Akihiko Takashima
 Director of Photography: Keishichi Kuroki
 Art Director: Masahiro Ioka
 Character Designer: Yasuji Mori
 Animation Director: Yasuji Mori

Season 1
 "Little house in a big forest" October 7, 1975
 "A wolf cub arrives"  October 14, 1975
 "Everyone's treasure"  October 21, 1975
 "The boy in the covered wagon" October 28, 1975
 "New house across the forest"  November 4, 1975
 "Bear cub we met at the waterfall"  November 11, 1975
 "My hero the cowboy"  November 18, 1975
 "A fawn is calling"   November 25, 1975
 "Bullets made by dad"  December 5, 1975
 "Bearded guest"  December 12, 1975
 "Lost migrating bird"  December 19, 1975
 "Where did Santa Claus go?"  December 26, 1975
 "Pa disappears in a snowstorm"  January 2, 1976
 "Dreams and hope! Departing for the prairies" January 9, 1976
 "Big adventure! Crossing the frozen lake" January 16, 1976
 "Jack the dog disappears"  January 23, 1976
 "Come back, Jack, my dear dog!"  January 30, 1976
 "Cute animals of the big prairies"  February 6, 1976
 "Build it quickly! Our new house" February 13, 1976
 "A wolf pack surrounds the house" February 20, 1976
 "New house built with Pa"  February 27, 1976
 "A cute calf has arrived!"  March 6, 1976
 "Perilous well-digging"  March 13, 1976
 "Something terrible happened!" March 20, 1976
 "My house is burning!!" March 27, 1976
 "Wheat, grow tall!"  April 3, 1976

References

External links
 
 

1975 anime television series debuts
Little House series
TBS Television (Japan) original programming
Historical anime and manga
Drama anime and manga
Television shows set in Wisconsin